Aisa Kyun Hota Hai? is a 2006 Bollywood film produced by Mahesh Bhatt for Vishesh Films, directed by Ajay Kanchan as his directorial debut, and starring Rati Agnihotri, Aryan Vaid, Gopi Bhalla, Mehul Bhojak, and Avtar Gill.

Plot
Kiran (Rati Agnihotri) marries Vivek, and shortly after they wed, they separate and Vivek returns to the U.S. and refuses to talk to Kiran, who gives birth to a son she names Raj.  She learns that Vivek never loved her but married her to gain funds in his fathers will requiring that he marry to inherit. Kiran decides to not tell Raj about his father. In college years later, Raj has become a star basketball player, who hates men who leave their families, using as examples Bhagwan Shri Ram who had abandoned his pregnant wife, and Bhagwan Shri Buddh who had abandoned his family. Raj has numerous affairs with fellow-collegians, and ends up contracting HIV.

Cast

 Rati Agnihotri as Kiran
 Aryan Vaid as Raj
 Gopi Bhalla
 Mehul Bhojak as Raunaq 'Ronny' Singh
 Avtar Gill as Inspector Premraj Bhatt
 Johnny Lever as Basketball Coach Banta Singh
 Rachana Maurya as Aditi
 Megha Chatterji		
 Dr. Dominic Emmanuel as Principal of Dominic Savio College
 Anisha Hinduja	
 Mitra Joshi		
 Akanksha Malhotra 
 Shruti Malhotra as Tanvi Hyder Ali Khan 
 Manish Mathur

Soundtrack

References

External links
 

2000s Hindi-language films
2006 films
2006 romantic drama films
Indian romantic drama films
HIV/AIDS in Indian films